Denver Coliseum is an indoor arena, owned by the City and County of Denver, operated by its Denver Arts & Venues and located in Denver, Colorado. The arena holds 10,200 people and was built from 1949 to 1951. The coliseum is located in Denver's Elyria-Swansea neighborhood. It sits where the Denver Pacific Railway broke ground on its Cheyenne line in 1868.

Opening on November 8, 1951, with a six-day run of Shipstads & Johnson Ice Follies, today the Denver Coliseum is an integral venue of the National Western Stock Show and hosts a multitude of other events including: commencement ceremonies, rodeos, ice shows, motor shows, circuses, concerts, motivational seminars, dances, exhibits and trade shows. Notables include: CHSAA high school volleyball, spirit and basketball playoffs and championships, Disney on Ice, The Denver March Pow Wow, The Denver Coliseum Mineral, Fossil, Gem, and Jewelry Show, cheerleading competitions and roller derby.

After McNichols Sports Arena (MSA) opened in 1975, the coliseum continued on as an alternate venue to the larger arena for events requiring less seating or overall space. This continues today after the Pepsi Center (now Ball Arena) opened in 1999, and the subsequent demolition of MSA in 2000.

History
On January 10, 1952, June Haver and Walter O'Keefe hosted the official dedication of the Coliseum on the eve of the first stock show in the arena and over the years the Coliseum hosted many celebrities and artists including: Elvis Presley (April 8, 1956 – 2 shows, November 17, 1970, April 30, 1973); The Grateful Dead (November 20 and 21, 1973); The Who (December 4 and 5, 1971); Frank Sinatra (May 1, 1975); The Rolling Stones (November 29, 1965; June 16, 1972); Led Zeppelin (March 25, 1970, June 21, 1972, May 25, 1973); Stevie Wonder (opening for the Rolling Stones on June 16, 1972, November 3, 1974); The Lovin' Spoonful; The Monkees; Cream; Crosby, Stills, Nash & Young (November 26, 1969, May 12, 1970); Ike & Tina Turner; The Jackson 5 (August 20, 1971) and (February 23, 1974); Black Sabbath (February 27 and October 18, 1971); The Moody Blues; Pink Floyd (April 17, 1975); Neil Diamond (May 8, 1971); Santana; Jethro Tull; Yes; Eagles (August 2, 1972); Bob Dylan; Eric Clapton; Rage Against the Machine (November 1999); Rammstein (May 20, 2012), Bassnectar (June 10, 1019) and many more.

The arena has been home ice to several hockey teams from various leagues including the Denver Cutthroats (2012–2014), the Denver/Colorado Rangers (1987–1989), the Denver Spurs (1968–1975), the Denver Invaders (1963–64) and the Denver Mavericks (1959). The University of Denver Pioneers college hockey team played many of its home games at the Coliseum during the renovation of the University of Denver Arena in 1972–73, and when the current Magness Arena was under construction, between 1997 and 1999.  The USA Curling Men's and Women's National Championships were held at the Denver Coliseum during February 5–11, 2023

The coliseum was also an annual stop for the Ringling Brothers and Barnum and Bailey Circus, the host of WCW's Spring Stampede (1998) and the Colorado Wildcats of the Professional Indoor Football League.

President Dwight Eisenhower stopped in Denver on his tour of western states in support of Republican candidates on October 8, 1962. In 1976, a planned Marvin Gaye concert was canceled after learning that Gaye was at his home in Los Angeles sleeping, led to rioting at the coliseum, a series of lawsuits for fraud and deceiving ticket buyers, and giving the media a field day as the top story.  On April 5, 2005, after a women's boxing match held at the coliseum, boxer Becky Zerlentes died of her injuries following a third-round knockout loss to Heather Schmitz.  Santana played the Denver Coliseum six times, securing the title of "House Band".

Denver Department of Public Health & Environment utilized the Coliseum as a shelter for people experiencing homelessness from 2020 to 2021 to provide safe distancing which existing shelters could not provide in response to COVID-19 and as a warming shelter for two nights of extreme cold during December 21–23, 2022.

References

External links

Indoor arenas in Colorado
Sports venues in Denver
Indoor ice hockey venues in Colorado
Denver Invaders
1951 establishments in Colorado
Sports venues completed in 1951
Indoor soccer venues in the United States